The 1942 March Field Flyers football team represented the United States Army Air Forces' Fourth Air Force stationed at March Field during the 1942 college football season. The base was located in Riverside, California. The team compiled a 5–2 record.

The team was coached by Major Paul J. Schissler, a former NFL coach.

Schedule

References

March Field
March Field Flyers football seasons
March Field Flyers football